Let's Go with Pancho Villa (Spanish: Vámonos con Pancho Villa) is a Mexican motion picture directed by Fernando de Fuentes in 1936, the last of the director's Revolution Trilogy, besides El prisionero trece and El compadre Mendoza.

An anti-epic based on a novel, it focuses on the cruelty of the Mexican Revolution and Pancho Villa himself, contrary to most of the Mexican movies about this national hero.

The movie is thought to have been the first Mexican super-production and led to the bankruptcy of the film company that made it.

Plot
Villa was portrayed by Domingo Soler. Directed by Fernando de Fuentes, the film tells the story of a group of friends who hear about the revolution and Villa and decide to join him, only to suffer the cruel reality of war under the command of a Villa who simply does not care about his men.

The movie has two endings: the original ending shows the last surviving friend returning to his home, disenchanted with both Villa and the Revolution.

The second ending, discovered many years later, returns to the same scene ten years later, when an old and weakened Villa tries to recruit the last survivor again; when the father hesitates as he does not want to leave his wife and daughter behind, Villa kills the wife and daughter. The angry father then tries to kill Villa, before another man shoots the father dead. Villa takes the sole survivor, the son, with him.

Background
A great failure when released, interest in the movie resurged many decades later, and today is considered one of the best movies of Mexican cinema both for its approach to the theme and its technical merits.

It stands apart among the many movies made about Villa in that it portrays the man and the Revolution in its cruelty; most other films, like those by Ismael Rodríguez in the 1960s, take an almost idyllic view of both, following the official (government) mythos.

The movie music was composed by Silvestre Revueltas, who makes a cameo appearance.

See also
 Cinema of Mexico

External links
 Movie review .
 

1936 films
Mexican black-and-white films
1936 drama films
Films shot in Mexico
1930s Spanish-language films
Films about Pancho Villa
Mexican Revolution films
Films directed by Fernando de Fuentes
Films scored by Silvestre Revueltas
Mexican drama films
1930s Mexican films